KTUA (88.1 FM) is a radio station licensed to Coweta, Oklahoma, United States, and serving the Tulsa area. The station is currently owned by the Educational Media Foundation and broadcasts the Air1 network.

History
In 2002, the Federal Communications Commission approved a 1996 application from David Ingles Ministries Church Inc. for a construction permit for this station. On January 6, 2003, the station took the call sign KDIM. Under David Ingles Ministries, KDIM was part of the Oasis Radio Network.

In 2021, KDIM was sold to the Educational Media Foundation for $2.415 million. When the sale closed on December 2, 2021, the station began airing EMF's Air 1 network. Air1 had been heard on KWRI (89.1 FM) at Bartlesville and two translators in the Tulsa metro area, which became KKLB and joined the K-Love network. The station changed its call sign to KTUA on December 21, 2021.

References

External links

TUA
Radio stations established in 2006
2006 establishments in Oklahoma
Educational Media Foundation radio stations
Air1 radio stations